Aurélie Marie Halbwachs (born 24 August 1986) is a Mauritian road bicycle racer. She is a four-time winner of Mauritius' Athlete of the Year, winning in 2006, 2008, 2010 and 2011.

Halbwachs started her career in cycling in 2006 and competed in various local and international tournaments. She competed at the 2008 Summer Olympics, finishing in 68th place, and the 2012 Summer Olympics in the Women's road race, where she failed to finish. Halbwachs was the winner of the time trial at the 2006 African Road Championships, and she won the gold medal in both the road race and the time trial at the 2017 championships. She has also won six individual national road cycling titles – three in the road race, three in the time trial.

Personal life
Halbwachs was born on 24 August 1986 in Curepipe, Mauritius. She is married to Yannick Lincoln who is a six time Tour Mauritius champion. She paired with him from 2003 in several mixed doubles squads and cycle championships. They got married in 2006. She gave birth to a girl child, Yana, on 13 September 2015. She volunteered in the initiative of the Ministry of Sports in Mauritius to build a velodrome constructed to enable the infrastructure facilities in Roches Brunes. She has partial association with South African Airways, who have enabled her to participate in mountain bike events.

Major results

2006
 African Road Championships
1st  Time trial
4th Road race
2007
 3rd  Time trial, African Road Championships
 5th Road race, All-Africa Games
2008
 African Road Championships
3rd  Time trial
3rd  Road race
2009
 African Road Championships
3rd  Time trial
4th Road race
2010
 African Road Championships
2nd  Time trial
3rd  Road race
2011
 National Road Championships
1st  Time trial
1st  Road race
 All-Africa Games
2nd  Time trial
3rd  Road race
 African Road Championships
3rd  Time trial
3rd  Road race
2012
 National Road Championships
1st  Time trial
1st  Road race
2015
 3rd  Time trial, African Road Championships
2016
 2nd Road race, National Road Championships
 African Road Championships
6th Time trial
7th Road race
2017
 African Road Championships
1st  Time trial
1st  Road race
2018
 5th Time trial, African Road Championships
2019
 African Games
2nd  Cross-country
2nd  Cross-country marathon
2nd  Road race
6th Time trial
 African Road Championships
4th Road race
8th Time trial
2020
 National Road Championships
1st  Time trial
1st  Road race
2022
 National Road Championships
1st  Road Race
2023
 African Road Championships 
1st  Team Time trial
1st  Time trial

Major championship results timeline

References

External links
 

1986 births
Living people
Mauritian female cyclists
Olympic cyclists of Mauritius
Cyclists at the 2008 Summer Olympics
Cyclists at the 2012 Summer Olympics
Cyclists at the 2010 Commonwealth Games
Commonwealth Games competitors for Mauritius
Cyclists at the 2014 Commonwealth Games
Cyclists at the 2018 Commonwealth Games
People from Plaines Wilhems District
Mauritian people of French descent
African Games silver medalists for Mauritius
African Games medalists in cycling
African Games bronze medalists for Mauritius
Competitors at the 2011 All-Africa Games
Competitors at the 2019 African Games